Cora hochesuordensis is a species of basidiolichen in the family Hygrophoraceae. Found in Bolivia, it was formally described as a new species in 2016 by Robert Lücking, Eduardo Morales, and Manuela Dal Forno. The specific epithet hochesuordensis refers to the Anglo-Saxon name Hochesuorde (in Nottinghamshire), one of two places in England from which the  surname Hawksworth is derived, and a tribute to mycologist David Leslie Hawksworth. The lichen is only known from the type locality in Corani Lake reservoir (Cochabamba), where it grows as an epiphyte on shrub twigs.

References

hochesuordensis
Lichen species
Lichens described in 2016
Lichens of Bolivia
Taxa named by Robert Lücking
Basidiolichens